Hans Leyendecker (born 12 May 1949) is a German journalist. He writes for the Süddeutsche Zeitung and is one of Germany's best known investigative journalists.

Leyendecker formerly worked for the magazine Der Spiegel, unveiling various political and economic scandals, such as the widespread illegal party financing during the 1980s, and that of the CDU in 1999. He also unveiled the smuggling of Russian plutonium into Germany, with the help of the foreign intelligence service Bundesnachrichtendienst in 1994, bribery at arms deals, German Visa Affair 2005 and corruption of the staff council at Volkswagen.

References

1949 births
Living people
German investigative journalists
German newspaper journalists
German journalists
German male journalists
German male non-fiction writers
Süddeutsche Zeitung people
Der Spiegel people
20th-century German journalists
21st-century German journalists